Zafarqand (also Romanized as Z̧afarqand; also known as Jaukand, Jūqand, and Zafarghand) is a village of Barzavand rural district in the Central District of Ardestan County, Isfahan Province, Iran. At the 2006 census, its population was 229, in 95 families.

References 

Populated places in Ardestan County